The 1903 Fairmount Wheatshockers football team was an American football team that represented Fairmount College (now known as Wichita State University) as an independent during the 1903 college football season. The team compiled a 6–2 record, shut out four of eight opponents, and outscored all opponents by a total of 126 to 27. The team had no coach; Walter Stahl was the team manager.

Schedule

References

Fairmount
Wichita State Shockers football seasons
Fairmount Wheatshockers football